Polonium monoxide (also known as polonium(II) oxide) is a chemical compound with the formula PoO. It is one of three oxides of polonium, the other two being polonium dioxide (PoO2) and polonium trioxide (PoO3). It is an interchalcogen.

Appearance and preparation
Polonium monoxide is a black solid. It is formed during the radiolysis of polonium sulfite (PoSO3) and polonium selenite (PoSeO3).

Chemistry
On contact with oxygen or water, both polonium monoxide and its related hydroxide (polonium(II) hydroxide, Po(OH)2) are oxidized quickly to Po(IV).

References

Polonium compounds
Oxides
Interchalcogens